Āgenskalns (historically known also as Hāgenskalns or Hagensberg) is a district in Riga, located on the left bank of the Daugava, an old neighbourhood, mainly built in the late 19th to early 20th century. The total area of Āgenskalns is 4,6 km2, which is a lot less than other districts of Riga.

History

First known building of Āgenskalns and whole Pārdaugava was the fortified Mara mill, which was mentioned already in 1226. As evidenced by maps of the 17th century, the village of Āgenskalns started next to crossroads of current Meža, Sētas and Nometņu Street and continued to develop alongside Nometņu Street. During the 17th century, Āgenskalns was little populated. Most of the non-auxiliary members of the Latvian trade house dominated there and also mercenaries - fishermen, anchors, wine barrel carriers, boatmen and others.

Name “Āgenskalns” came from a manor of Henrih fon Hagen, who was a judge in the 17th century (from the German Hagenshof, nowadays known as Švarcmuiža), and who was the owner of lands alongside Rankas dam and Kuldīgas Street. During the Great Northern War, Āgenskalns was destroyed, but later restored.

During the French invasion of Russia, in fear of Napoleon's troops, all the buildings of Āgenskalns were burned down, so the buildings that are there nowadays started to develop in the first half of the 19th century. The layout of buildings was made without a certain plan and that is why street network between Nometņu and Eduarda Smiļģa Street is quite chaotic.  Nowadays this territory is a national monument of urban construction and is known for its great wooden architecture.

Architecture
Oldest building in Āgenskalns is the Hartmann manor, located in Kalnciema street 28/30. Āgenskalns is a vivid example of Art Nouveau and German Balts architectural symbiosis. One of the best examples of this is the water tower of Āgenskalns, which was projected by Wilhelm Bockslaff and built in 1910. – entrance of the water tower is decorated with various geometric ornaments that end with a triangular timpanon; other Art Nouveau features can also be seen there (stylized imperial eagle etc.). In the nearby Margrietas street you can find one of Mikhail Eisenstein projected buildings, which shows a strong influence of historicism. In Āgenskalns there are many residential and commercial houses, which have been built in the 19th and 20th century, where you can find the influence of Art Nouveau. One of the most prominent Art Nouveau complexes is the Market of Āgenskalns, which was built after a project of Reinhold Schmaeling, current Market building was built from 1911 until 1924. Pauls Stradiņš Clinical University Hospital was also built after one of his project and is located in Āgenskalns, Pilsoņu Street 13. Other mentionable Art Nouveau features can be found in Arcadia Park, made after a project of Georg Kuphaldt in 1910.

Notable places in Agenskalns
Āgenskalns Market - Built in 1911 – 1914
Railroad Museum
Eduards Smiļģis Theatre Museum
Uzvaras Park
Jānis Akuraters Museum
Ojārs Vācietis Museum
Pauls Stradiņš Clinical University Hospital - built in 1908 - 1910

Schools

University of Latvia Faculty of Physics and Mathematics
Riga Technical University Faculty of Engineering Economics and Management; Faculty of Computer Science and Information Technology
University of Business, Arts and Technology
Emīls Dārziņš Music School

References

Neighbourhoods in Riga